Tan Sri Dato' Mohamad Ariff bin Md Yusof (Jawi: محمد عارف بن مد يوسف; born 1949) is a Malaysian politician who served as the 9th Speaker of the Dewan Rakyat, the lower chamber of the Parliament of Malaysia from July 2018 to his removal from speakership in July 2020. He is a member of the National Trust Party (AMANAH), a component party of the Pakatan Harapan (PH) opposition coalition. He resigned from all AMANAH party positions but not membership to become more impartial after being appointed to the Dewan Rakyat speakership. Therefore, he remains an AMANAH ordinary member.

Early life and education 
Mohamad Ariff was born in Sungai Petani, Kedah in 1949. He graduated from the London School of Economics (LSE) with a Bachelor's degree in law.

Career 
Mohamad Ariff joined the Faculty of Law in University of Malaya once he graduated from LSE. In 1986, he became an advocate and a solicitor at his own legal practice called Cheang & Ariff.

Mohamad Ariff joined the Securities Commission Malaysia (SC) and became the first Market Supervision Department Director from 1993 to 1995. From 1995 to 1996, he served as a Director of Kuala Lumpur Options and Super Exchange (KLOSE). He served as a member of the advisory board of Company's Commission of Malaysia from 2007 to 2008. He also was a member of the Rating Review Committee and Malaysian Rating Agency until 2008.

Mohamad Ariff was appointed a Judicial Commissioner for the High Court of Malaya in 2008. He was made a full judge of the same in 2009. In 2012, he was elevated to the Court of Appeal. He retired from the Malaysian Judiciary in 2015 and returned to his prior legal practice, Cheang & Ariff.

Mohamad Ariff was a high court judge during the 2009 Perak constitutional crisis. He also served as the judge removing the Home Ministry's ban on the book authored by the Sisters in Islam (SIS) entitled Muslim Women and the Challenges of Islamic Extremism. As a Court of Appeal Judge, he led a panel of judges in the case of Teoh Beng Hock, a man killed while in the custody of the Malaysian Anti-Corruption Commission (MACC).

Politics
Then he joined National Trust Party (AMANAH), a component party of Pakatan Harapan (PH) coalition in 2015. He resigned all of his party posts and became an independent politician on 1 July 2018 in order to become the PH coalition's candidate for the speakership.

Election results

Honours

Honours of Malaysia
  :
  Commander of the Order of Loyalty to the Crown of Malaysia (PSM) – Tan Sri (2019)
  :
  Knight Companion of the Order of Loyalty to the Royal House of Kedah (DSDK) – Dato' (2012)

See also
 Speaker of the Dewan Rakyat

References 

1949 births
Living people
People from Kedah
Malaysian people of Malay descent
Malaysian Muslims
20th-century Malaysian lawyers
21st-century Malaysian judges
Malaysian Islamic Party politicians
National Trust Party (Malaysia) politicians
Independent politicians in Malaysia
Members of the Dewan Rakyat
Speakers of the Dewan Rakyat
Members of Lincoln's Inn
Commanders of the Order of Loyalty to the Crown of Malaysia
21st-century Malaysian politicians